The black-sided flowerpecker (Dicaeum monticolum), also known as the Bornean flowerpecker, is a species of bird in the family Dicaeidae. It is endemic to the island of Borneo, where it is found in the mountains, primarily above  in elevation. The species is sexually dimorphic. The female is olive-green above and greyish below, with buffy flanks and a whitish throat. It inhabits a range of forest habitats, including primary and secondary montane forest, kerangas forest, and scrub, and is also occasionally found in gardens. It feeds primarily on small fruits—particularly mistletoe berries—as well as seeds, nectar, and various invertebrates. It builds a nest of moss, camouflaged on the outside with lichens and lined with the pith of tree ferns. The International Union for Conservation of Nature rates it as a species of least concern. Though its numbers have not been quantified, the black-sided flowerpecker is said to be common throughout much of its range, and any declines are not thought to be precipitous. However, destruction of forest for palm plantations may impact it.

Taxonomy and systematics
When Richard Bowdler Sharpe first described the black-sided flowerpecker in 1887, using a specimen collected on Borneo's Mount Kinabalu, he named it Dicaeum monticolum. It is closely allied to, and forms a superspecies with, four other species: blood-breasted flowerpecker, mistletoebird, grey-sided flowerpecker, and fire-breasted flowerpecker. At points in the past, it has been considered conspecific with one or more of those other species in a variety of combinations by a variety of authors. The grey-sided flowerpecker, which is endemic to Sulawesi, is its closest relative. There are no subspecies.

The genus name Dicaeum is an Ancient Greek word, perhaps for an Indian bird mentioned by Aelianus. The species name monticolum is Latin for "mountain dweller" or "mountaineer". It is also known as the Bornean flowerpecker.

Description
The black-sided flowerpecker is a very small passerine, measuring a mere  in length. Its weight has not been recorded. Like many flowerpeckers, it is sexually dimorphic; the male is considerably more colourful than the female. The male has glossy blue-black upperparts. His face and the sides of his neck are black, his chin is white, and he has a scarlet throat and breast surrounded by a greyish-black border. His upper flanks and upper belly are dark grey, while his lower flanks are olive, and his lower belly white. His  are white, as are his . The female has olive-green upperparts and greyish underparts, with buffy , a yellowish rump, a whitish throat and white pectoral tufts. Immature birds are like the female, but more olive-grey below. They are finely streaked with dark from their chin to the breast, and males may show some crimson on the breast. Both sexes have dark brown irises, black bills, and feet variously described as brown or dark grey.

Voice

The black-sided flowerpecker has a number of vocalisations, including a high-pitched zit, a high, weak tseeep, a quick tsit-tsit, a slurred tsweet tsweet, and a loud, steady clicking.

Similar species
The female can be confused with the plain flowerpecker, but is larger and has a whiter throat. Her back is also more olive-toned, as compared to the browner-backed plain flowerpecker. All other similar species are allopatric—not found on Borneo—so not likely to be confused.

Habitat and range
The black-sided flowerpecker is endemic to the montane forests of Borneo. There are far more records from Malaysia's states of Sabah and Sarawak than from Indonesia's Kalimantan provinces. It is found in primary and secondary forest, kerangas forest (heathland), scrub, and gardens.

Ecology
The black-sided flowerpecker is not known to make any seasonal or altitudinal movements.

Feeding
Like all flowerpeckers, the black-sided flowerpecker is a frugivore. It specializes on mistletoe berries (particularly those of the family Loranthaceae), but also eats other small fruits, including Medinilla speciosa berries. Its diet includes seeds, nectar, and various invertebrates. Most of its foraging takes place close to the ground, but it sometimes feeds in the canopy.

Breeding
Little is known about the breeding ecology of the black-sided flowerpecker. Young have been recorded between November and February, and adults in breeding condition have been found during that period. The nest is made of moss and lined with the pith of tree ferns. Lichens are used to camouflage its surface. The eggs are undescribed.

Conservation
The International Union for Conservation of Nature rates the black-sided flowerpecker as a species of least concern, though its population has not been quantified. While its numbers are thought to be decreasing, the rate of decline is not thought to be precipitous, and the population is not fragmented. The species is said to be common throughout much of its range. Destruction of forest for oil palm plantations could have a detrimental impact on their numbers. Studies have shown that black-sided flowerpeckers are only found in palm groves in small numbers and within  of the edge of forest; they were not found further into extensive groves.

References

Notes

General references

External links
 

Dicaeum
Endemic birds of Borneo
Birds described in 1887
Taxa named by Richard Bowdler Sharpe
Taxonomy articles created by Polbot
Fauna of the Borneo montane rain forests